A pantomime dame is a traditional role in British and Irish pantomime. It is part of the theatrical tradition of travesti portrayal of female characters by male actors in drag. Dame characters are often played either in an extremely camp style, or else by men acting butch in women's clothing. They usually wear heavy make up and big hair, have exaggerated physical features, and perform in an over-the-top style.

Dame characters

Characters who are played as pantomime dames are often, though not exclusively, older, matronly women. They may be the protagonist's mother, as in Jack and the Beanstalk and Robinson Crusoe, or a nursemaid to the protagonist, as in Sleeping Beauty and Snow White. Although often warm and sympathetic characters, dames may also be employed as comic antagonists, such as with the Ugly Sisters in Cinderella. Although some pantomimes traditionally do not contain standard dame roles, certain productions of those stories add a dame character, for example, in many versions of Peter Pan. Other examples of dame characters include:
Widow Twankey, Aladdin's mother in the pantomime versions of the story
Mother Goose
The nanny or nurse in Babes in the Woods 
The cook in Dick Whittington
The queen in Puss in Boots
Goldilocks' mother in Goldilocks and the Three Bears, who runs a circus in many versions of the pantomime.

Notable pantomime dames
Peter Alexander – (born 1952) Notable dame in pantomimes in Yorkshire.
Stanley Baxter – (born 1926) Award winning Scottish actor and impressionist, famous for his lavish productions, notably at The King's Theatre, Glasgow
Christopher Biggins – (born 1948) TV personality, actor
Steven Blakeley – (born 1982) Blakeley has appeared in numerous pantomimes at Theatre Royal Windsor 
Douglas Byng – (1893–1988) A legendary dame who appeared in over 50 pantomimes, Byng was also a noted cabaret and revue artiste. He was the first glamorous dame and designed all his own costumes.
Herbert Campbell (1844–1904)  a highly popular pantomime dame alongside  Dan Leno at the Theatre Royal Drury Lane.
Les Dawson – (1931–1993) English comedian, remembered for his deadpan style and curmudgeonly persona.
Norman Evans – (1901–1962) "Evans' distinctive dame evolved out of nosy neighbour Fanny Fairbottom, a character he played on the sketch show Mr Tower of London. Fanny was hugely popular, and allegedly inspired Les Dawson to create the character of Ada" 
Rikki Fulton – (1924–2004) Award winning Scottish actor and comedian who also made numerous appearances in Scottish pantomimes, notably at The King's Theatre, Glasgow
Patrick Fyffe – (1942–2002)  Creator of Dame Hilda Bracket, one half of Hinge and Bracket.
Shaun Glenville – (1884–1968), had a 50 year career in pantomime, often opposite his wife Dorothy Ward.
Chris Harris – (1942–2014) Dame at Theatre Royal, Bath for many years, and writer and director of many pantomimes.
Melvyn Hayes – (born 1935) TV personality, actor well known for playing Gunner/Bombardier 'Gloria' Beaumont in BBC TV's It Ain't Half Hot Mum
John Inman – (1935–2007) Camp comedy actor well known for playing Mr Humphries in BBC TV's Are You Being Served?
Berwick Kaler – (born 1947) Currently Britain's longest serving, Kaler has played his extremely non–camp dame at York Theatre Royal since 1977
George Lacy – (1904–1989) - Widely regarded as the finest Dame of his generation, and the originator of the Dame's multiple costume changes. 
Danny La Rue – (1927–2009) Irish–born British entertainer known for his singing and female–impersonation
Dave Lee – (1948–2012) British comedian known for his work in pantomimes around Kent
Dan Leno – (1860–1904) a legendary pantomime dame, whose ghost is said to haunt the Theatre Royal Drury Lane.
John Linehan (born 1952) – Northern Irish actor and pantomime dame better known as the character May McFettridge.  Resident Dame at Grand Opera House, Belfast.
G. S. Melvin – (1886–1946) Scottish pantomime dame famous for his song "I'm Happy When I'm Hiking".
Horace Mills – (1864–1941) British pantomime dame of the early 20th–century particularly at the Prince's Theatre in Bristol 
Jimmy O'Dea – (1899–1965) Irish actor and portrayer of Biddy Mulligan the Pride of the Coombe in Dublin pantomimes
Paul O'Grady – (born 1955) British comedian and actor best known for presenting the daytime chat television series, The Paul O'Grady Show and his drag queen comedic alter ego, Lily Savage.
Shaun Prendergast (born 1958) – Resident Dame at Lyric Theatre, Hammersmith since 2010. Has been quoted in the Daily Telegraph as being 'finest, funniest pantomime Dame in London'.
Harry "Little Tich" Relph – (1867–1928) He was noted for his various characters, including The Spanish Señora, The Gendarme, and The Tax Collector, but his most popular routine was his Big Boot dance, which involved a pair of 28-inch boots.
Clive Rowe – (born 1964) Regularly plays the Dame at the Hackney Empire and was nominated for an Olivier Award in 2008 for his performance in 'Mother Goose' at said venue. 
Allan Stewart - (born 1950) Scottish entertainer best known for playing dame at the King’s Theatre, Edinburgh who played Buttons, Wishee Washee and other comic parts for many years but transitioned to playing dame after playing the character of Aunty May on TV.
Kenneth Alan Taylor – (born 1937)  playing the pantomime dame for many years in his own productions at Nottingham Playhouse 
Tommy Trafford – (1927–1993) Lancashire comedian and noted pantomime dame.
Jack Tripp – (1922–2005) An English comic actor, singer and dancer who appeared in seaside variety shows and revues.
Nick Wilton – (born 1957) English actor and scriptwriter, been a professional dame every Christmas since 2000.

See also
Cross-gender acting
Principal boy
Drag show
Köçek
Travesti (theatre)
Womanless wedding

References

Cross-dressing
Female stock characters
Theatre-related lists